Ophiusa arfaki is a moth of the family Erebidae. It is found in New Guinea.

References
  (1989). Lepidopterorum Catalogus (New Series) Fascicle 118, Noctuidae. CRC Press. , 

Ophiusa
Moths described in 1910